Naufraga hexachaeta is a species of fly in the family Dolichopodidae. It is the only member of the genus Naufraga, and is found in New Zealand.

References 

Sciapodinae
Diptera of New Zealand
Taxa named by Octave Parent
Insects described in 1933
Endemic insects of New Zealand